Chung Wai Ho (Chinese: 鍾偉豪; born 17 November 1990 in Hong Kong) is a former Hong Kong professional footballer who currently plays as a goalkeeper for Hong Kong Second Division club Kowloon City.

Club career
Chung started his professional career with Eastern. 

In 2013, he signed for Yuen Long, where he made only one appearance.

After that, he also played for Yau Tsim Mong and Citizen.

In 2018, he signed for Happy Valley.

On 3 September 2021, Chung announced that he was retiring from professional football to focus on his day job while continuing as an amateur player for Kowloon City.

References

External links
HKFA

Living people
1990 births
Hong Kong people
Hong Kong footballers
Hong Kong Premier League players
Hong Kong First Division League players
Yuen Long FC players
Citizen AA players
Happy Valley AA players
Association football goalkeepers